Cham Qasemali-ye Yek (also Romanized as Cham Qāsem‘alī-ye Yek; also known as Cham Qāsem‘alī and Cham Qāsem ‘Alī) is a village in Howmeh-ye Sharqi Rural District, in the Central District of Ramhormoz County, Khuzestan Province, Iran. At the 2006 census, its population was 85, in 17 families.

References 

Populated places in Ramhormoz County